Moshe Sharon (born December 18, 1937) is an Israeli historian of Islam.

He is currently Professor Emeritus of Islamic and Middle Eastern Studies at the Hebrew University of Jerusalem where he serves as Chair in Baháʼí Studies.

Education, career, and private life
Sharon was born in Haifa in 1937. He joined the faculty of Hebrew University of Jerusalem in 1965 and would go on to earn a Ph.D. at the same institution in 1971. He served as an Arab Affairs adviser to Prime Minister Menachem Begin and served in the Ministry of Defense, during which took part in the negotiations for peace with Egypt. Sharon established the Centre of Jewish Studies at the University of the Witwatersrand, which he directed while serving as director of the World Zionist Organization branch in Johannesburg. In 1999 he was appointed to the chair of Baháʼí Studies at Hebrew University. Sharon was elected to the American Philosophical Society in 2014. He and his wife, Judy, have six children.

Research interests 
Moshe Sharon has written about early Islamic history and the development of Shia Islam. He is a specialist in Arabic epigraphy and papyrology, with his opus being Corpus Inscriptionum Arabicarum Palaestinae. In 2005 he published the first translation into Hebrew of Kitáb-i-Aqdas, the holy book of the Baháʼí faith, and included a study of the history and theology of the religion.

Views
Moshe Sharon has given many presentations at international conferences and been interviewed by numerous media outlets on a variety of contemporary and historical topics.

Baháʼí Faith
Moshe Sharon is interviewed in the 2007 Israeli documentary film, "Bahais in My Backyard." In the interview he states that the only Baháʼí academic chair in the world is in Israel due to his efforts in convincing Hebrew University to establish one and his efforts in finding a benefactor to fund the position. He also says that there are no descendants of Bahá'u'lláh in Israel. Despite Sharon's denial of the existence of such relatives, there are, in fact, dozens, and one of Bahá'u'lláh's great-granddaughters is featured in the film. Furthermore, even at the time of the interview, there were other Baháʼí academic chairs in existence, such as the ones established at Devi Ahilya Vishwavidyalaya, a state university in Madhya Pradesh in 1991 and at the University of Maryland in 1993.

Islam
Moshe Sharon believes that Western leaders fail to understand Islam. He says that "There is no fundamental Islam. There is only Islam full stop." Citing the conflict in Yugoslavia, Sharon continues that "Wherever you have Islam, you will have war. It grows out of the attitude of Islamic civilization." He furthermore argues that not only is there "open war, but there's also war by infiltration."

Israeli–Palestinian conflict
Regarding the Israeli–Palestinian conflict, Moshe Sharon has said that there is "no possibility of peace between Israel and the Palestinians whatsoever, for ever" and that peace agreements with Arabs are "pieces of paper, parts of tactics, strategies... with no meaning." He opposed the Oslo peace accords and believes the dismantling the Israeli settlements, which he terms "expulsions," serve to "increase the appetite of the other side and only achieve the killing of Jews."

Iran
Moshe Sharon said in an interview that "The only way to avoid military confrontation with Iran is to leave this military confrontation to powers bigger than Israel."

Books 
 Judaism, Christianity, and Islam: Interaction and Conflict, 1989
 Revolt: The Social and Military Aspects of the Abbasid Revolution: Black Banners from the East II, 1990
 Judaism in the Context of Diverse Civilizations, 1993
 Editor, The Holy Land in History and Thought: Papers Submitted to the International Conference on the Relations Between the Holy Land and the World Outside It, 1997

</ref>
 Studies in Modern Religions, Religious Movements and the Babi-Baháʼí Faiths, 2004

References 

Israeli historians
Jewish historians
Israeli political writers
Zionists
Hebrew University of Jerusalem alumni
Academic staff of the Hebrew University of Jerusalem
Living people
1937 births
Anti-Islam sentiment in Israel
Jewish scholars of Islam
Scholars of medieval Islamic history
People from Haifa
Members of the American Philosophical Society